Andrea Becali (born 24 April 2004) is a Cuban swimmer. She competed in the women's 200 metre backstroke event at the 2018 FINA World Swimming Championships (25 m), in Hangzhou, China. In the same year, she won the bronze medal in the women's 4 x 200 metre freestyle relay event at the 2018 Central American and Caribbean Games held in Barranquilla, Colombia.

References

2004 births
Living people
Cuban female swimmers
Female backstroke swimmers
Place of birth missing (living people)
Competitors at the 2018 Central American and Caribbean Games
Central American and Caribbean Games bronze medalists for Cuba
Central American and Caribbean Games medalists in swimming
21st-century Cuban women